The United States Olympic & Paralympic Committee (USOPC) is the National Olympic Committee and the National Paralympic Committee for the United States. It was founded in 1895 as the United States Olympic Committee, and is headquartered in Colorado Springs, Colorado. The USOPC is one of only four NOCs in the world that also serve as the National Paralympic Committee for their country. The USOPC is responsible for supporting, entering and overseeing U.S. teams for the Olympic Games, Paralympic Games, Youth Olympic Games, Pan American Games, and Parapan American Games and serves as the steward of the Olympic and Paralympic Movements in the United States.

The Olympic Movement is overseen by the International Olympic Committee (IOC). The IOC is supported by 35 international federations that govern each sport on a global level, National Olympic Committees that oversee Olympic sport as a whole in their respective nations, and national federations that administer each sport at the national level (called National Governing Bodies, or NGBs, in the United States). The National Paralympic Committee is the sole governing body responsible for the selection and training of all athletes participating in the Paralympic Games.

The USOPC is one of 204 NOCs and 174 NPCs within the international Olympic and Paralympic movements. Forty-seven NGBs are members of the USOPC. Fifteen of the NGBs also manage sports on the Paralympic program (there are fewer Paralympic sports in the world). While the USOPC governs four Paralympic sports (cycling, skiing, swimming and track & field), five other Paralympic sports are governed by U.S. members of International Paralympic Federations (wheelchair basketball, boccia, goalball, powerlifting and wheelchair rugby).

Unlike most other nations, the United States government does not have a Ministry of Sports and does not fund its Olympic Committee. This is in part due to the taboo of mixing sports and politics in the US. The USOPC was reorganized by the Ted Stevens Olympic and Amateur Sports Act, originally enacted in 1978. It is a federally chartered nonprofit corporation and does not receive federal financial support (other than for select Paralympic military programs). Pursuant to the Act, the USOPC has the exclusive right to use and authorize the use of Olympic-related marks, images and terminology in the United States. The USOPC licenses that right to sponsors as a means of generating revenue in support of its mission.

The USOPC was previously called the United States Olympic Committee (USOC), but changed its name on June 20, 2019, the first Olympic Committee in the world to include the word “Paralympic” in its name.

History

Upon the founding of the International Olympic Committee in 1894, the two American IOC members – James Edward Sullivan and William Milligan Sloane – formed a committee to organize the participation of American athletes in the 1896 Summer Olympics, in Athens, Greece. In 1921, the committee adopted a constitution and bylaws to formally organize the American Olympic Association.

From 1928 to 1953, its president was Avery Brundage, who later went on to become the president of the IOC, the only American to do so.

In 1940, the AOA changed its name to the United States of America Sports Federation and, in 1945, changed it again to the United States Olympic Association. In 1950, federal mandate allowed the USOA to solicit tax-deductible contributions as a private, non-profit corporation. After several constitutional revisions were made to the federal charter in 1961, the name was changed to the United States Olympic Committee.

The Amateur Sports Act of 1978 (later renamed in the Ted Stevens Olympic and Amateur Sports Act) established the USOPC, then referred to as the USOC (United States Olympic Committee), as the coordinating body for all Olympic-related athletic activity in the United States, specifically relating to international competition. The USOPC was also given the responsibility of promoting and supporting physical fitness and public participation in athletic activities by encouraging developmental programs in its member organizations. The provisions protect individual athletes, and provide the USOPC's counsel and authority to oversee Olympic and Paralympic business in the United States.

The public law not only protects the trademarks of the IOC and USOPC, but also gives the USOPC exclusive rights to the words "Olympic", "Olympiad" and "Citius, Altius, Fortius", as well as commercial use of Olympic and Paralympic marks and terminology in the United States, excluding Northern Mariana Islands, American Samoa, Guam, Puerto Rico and the U.S. Virgin Islands, which fall under the authority of separate NOCs and NPCs.

One of the many revolutionary elements contained within the legislation was the Paralympic Amendment – an initiative that fully integrated the Paralympic Movement into the USOPC by Congressional mandate in 1998.

U.S. Paralympics, a division of the USOPC, was founded in 2001. In addition to selecting and managing the teams which compete for the United States in the Paralympic Games, U.S. Paralympics is also responsible for supporting Paralympic community and military sports programs around the country. In 2006, the USOPC created the Paralympic Military Program with the goal of providing Paralympic sports as a part of the rehabilitation process for injured soldiers. Through the U.S. Olympic Committee Paralympic Military Program, USOPC hosted the Warrior Games for wounded service personnel from 2010 to 2014, until the organization of the event was taken on by the Department of Defense in 2015.

The USOPC moved its headquarters from New York City to Colorado Springs on July 1, 1978. The USOPC headquarters moved to its present location in downtown Colorado Springs in April 2010, while the previous site – located just 2 miles (3 km) away – remains a U.S. Olympic Training Center.

In October 2007, the ARCO Training Center in Chula Vista, California (see below) was closed temporarily due to the Harris Fire, one of many that ravaged southern California.

After convening in 2010 the Working Group for Safe Training Environments, the USOPC formed the Safe Sport program to address child sexual abuse, bullying, hazing and harassment and emotional, physical and sexual misconduct within its domain.

In February 2011, the USOPC launched an anti-steroid campaign in conjunction with the Ad Council called "Play Asterisk Free" aimed at teens. The campaign first launched in 2008 under the name "Don't Be An Asterisk".

The state-of-the-art United States Olympic & Paralympic Museum was officially opened in Colorado Springs on July 30, 2020.

The USOPC remains one of the only National Olympic Committees in the world to receive no government funding.

Governance
The USOPC is governed by a 16-member board of directors and a professional staff headed by a CEO. The USOPC also has three constituent councils to serve as sources of opinion and advice to the board and USOPC staff, including the Athletes' Advisory Council, National Governing Bodies Council and Multi-Sport Organizations Council. The AAC and NGBC have three representatives on the board, while six members of the board are independent. The USOPC CEO and all American members of the IOC (Anita DeFrantz, James Easton and Angela Ruggiero) are ex officio members of the board.

The USOPC named Blackmun CEO on January 6, 2010. Blackmun held a previous stint at the USOPC, serving as acting chief executive officer (2001), senior managing director of sport (2000) and general counsel (1999). He also serves on the IOC's Marketing Commission and on the board of the National Foundation for Fitness, Sports and Nutrition. He retired in 2018 and was replaced by Sarah Hirshland.

On October 2, 2008, Lawrence F. Probst III was elected chairman of the USOPC board of directors. Probst also serves on the IOC's International Relations Commission, a post he assumed by IOC appointment on March 10, 2011. Probst retired in 2019 and was replaced by Susanne Lyons.

National Governing Body members
National Governing Bodies are organizations that look after all aspects of their individual sports. The NGBs are responsible for the training, competition and development of athletes for their sports, as well as nominating athletes to the U.S. Olympic, Paralympic, Youth Olympic, Pan American and Para-Pan American Teams.  There are currently 39 Olympic summer sport NGBs in the United States and eight Olympic winter sport NGBs. Sport climbing, skateboarding, and surfing were added to the Olympic roster of sports for the 2020 Olympics in Tokyo, Japan. Some Olympic sports are not featured in the Paralympics, that is why there are more solely Olympic NGBs rather than those that manage both Olympic and Paralympic divisions.

Fundraising efforts
The United States Olympic & Paralympic Committee is a 501(c)(3) not-for-profit corporation supported by American individuals and corporate sponsors. Unlike most other nations, the USOPC does not receive direct government funding for Olympic programs (except for select Paralympic military programs).

The USOPC's main sources of revenue are television broadcast rights, sponsorships and philanthropy in the form of major gifts and direct mail income. Additional funding comes from the government for Paralympic programming, as well as other sources such as the city of Colorado Springs and the U.S. Olympic and Paralympic Foundation.

The USOPC asks for contributions from time to time using public service announcements and other direct solicitations.  Also, some proceeds from sales in its online store benefit the committee.

The USOPC currently does not hold telethons or other fundraising events, but has in the past.

Criticism
There has been some financial conflict between the USOPC and International Olympic Committee (IOC), with some pointing out the frequent leadership changes of USOPC, and USOPC trying to broadcast the Olympics using its own television network, which the IOC discouraged. USOPC president Peter Ueberroth allegedly stonewalled a negotiation between IOC and USOPC to discuss the revenue sharing of the US broadcasts with IOC. Under a long-standing contract, the USOPC has received a 20 percent share of global sponsorship revenue and a 12.75 percent cut of U.S. broadcast rights deals (not that much given the fact that the USOPC is the only NOC in the world not to receive government funding, other countries fund their Olympic Committees, plus more than a half of the Olympic global sponsors are American companies, but the USOPC received only 20% (not 50%) of sponsorship revenue). The IOC believed the USOPC share, set out in an open-ended contract dating to 1996, was excessive and should be renegotiated. The USOPC argued that it saved the Olympic movement by hosting the most financially successful Games in the history of the Olympics in 1984. In the 1980s, after the disastrous and unprofitable 1976 and 1980 Olympics, many believed the Olympic movement was in decline. However, the U.S. hosted the most financially successful games without government funding (unlike Montreal 1976 and Moscow 1980) and revitalized the Olympic movement. The failure of the 2012 and 2016 US Olympic bids was partly blamed by some on USOPC. For instance, NBC television executive Dick Ebersol said after the failed 2016 bid, "This was the IOC membership saying to the USOPC there will be no more domestic Olympics until you give more to the IOC". A new revenue-sharing agreement was signed in 2012.

USOPC has also been criticized for not providing equal funding to Paralympic athletes, compared to Olympic athletes. In 2003, a lawsuit was filed by American Paralympic athletes Tony Iniguez, Scot Hollonbeck and Jacob Heilveil. They alleged that the USOPC was underfunding American Paralympic athletes. Iniguez cited the fact that the USOPC made health care benefits available to a smaller percentage of Paralympians, provided smaller quarterly training stipends and paid smaller financial awards for medals won at the Paralympics. American Paralympians saw this as a disadvantage for Paralympic athletes, as nations such as Canada and the United Kingdom support Paralympians and Olympians virtually equally. The USOPC did not deny the discrepancy in funding, but contended that this was due to the fact that it did not receive any government financial support. As a result, it had to rely on revenue generated by the media exposure of its athletes. Olympic athletic success resulted in greater exposure for the USOPC than Paralympic athletic achievements. The case was heard by lower courts, who ruled that the USOPC has the right to allocate its finances to athletes at different rates. The case was appealed to the Supreme Court, who on September 6, 2008, announced that it would not hear the appeal. However, during the time the lawsuit had lasted (from 2003 to 2008), the funding of Paralympic athletes more than tripled. In 2008, $11.4 million was earmarked for Paralympic athletes, up from $3 million in 2004. In 2018, the USOPC announced it would increase its Operation Gold Awards for U.S. Paralympic athletes to be equal to payments earned by U.S. Olympic athletes.

In 2003, Wade Exum, the United States Olympic Committee's director of drug control administration from 1991 to 2000, gave copies of documents to Sports Illustrated that revealed that some 100 American athletes failed drug tests from 1988 to 2000, arguing that they should have been prevented from competing in the Olympics but were nevertheless cleared to compete; among those athletes were Carl Lewis, Joe DeLoach and Floyd Heard. Before showing the documents to Sports Illustrated, Exum tried to use them in a lawsuit against USOC, accusing the organization of racial discrimination and wrongful termination against him and cover-up over the failed tests. His case was summarily dismissed by the Denver federal Court for lack of evidence. The USOC claimed his case "baseless" as he himself was the one in charge of screening the anti-doping test program of the organization and clarifying that the athletes were cleared according to the rules.

Carl Lewis broke his silence on allegations that he was the beneficiary of a drugs cover-up, admitting he had failed tests for banned substances, but claiming he was just one of "hundreds" of American athletes who were allowed to escape bans, concealed by the USOC. Lewis has acknowledged that he failed three tests during the 1988 US Olympic trials, which under international rules at the time should have prevented him from competing in the 1988 Summer Olympics. Former athletes and officials came out against the USOC cover-up. "For so many years I lived it. I knew this was going on, but there's absolutely nothing you can do as an athlete. You have to believe governing bodies are doing what they are supposed to do. And it is obvious they did not," said former American sprinter and 1984 Olympic champion, Evelyn Ashford.

Exum's documents revealed that Carl Lewis had tested positive three times at the 1988 Olympics trials for minimum amounts of pseudoephedrine, ephedrine, and phenylpropanolamine, which were banned stimulants. Bronchodilators are also found in cold medication. Due to the rules, his case could have led to disqualification from the Seoul Olympics and suspension from competition for six months. The levels of the combined stimulants registered in the separate tests were 2 ppm, 4 ppm and 6 ppm. Lewis defended himself, claiming that he had accidentally consumed the banned substances. After the supplements that he had taken were analyzed to prove his claims, the USOC accepted his claim of inadvertent use, since a dietary supplement he ingested was found to contain "Ma huang", the Chinese name for Ephedra (ephedrine is known to help weight loss). Fellow Santa Monica Track Club teammates Joe DeLoach and Floyd Heard were also found to have the same banned stimulants in their systems, and were cleared to compete for the same reason. The highest level of the stimulants Lewis recorded was 6 ppm, which was regarded as a positive test in 1988 but is now regarded as negative test. The acceptable level has been raised to ten parts per million for ephedrine and twenty-five parts per million for other substances. According to the IOC rules at the time, positive tests with levels lower than 10 ppm were cause of further investigation but not immediate ban. Neal Benowitz, a professor of medicine at UC San Francisco who is an expert on ephedrine and other stimulants, agreed that "These [levels] are what you'd see from someone taking cold or allergy medicines and are unlikely to have any effect on performance." Following Exum's revelations the IAAF acknowledged that at the 1988 Olympic Trials the USOC indeed followed the correct procedures in dealing with eight positive findings for ephedrine and ephedrine-related compounds in low concentration. Additionally, in 1988 the federation reviewed the relevant documents with the athletes' names undisclosed and stated that "the medical committee felt satisfied, however, on the basis of the information received that the cases had been properly concluded by the USOC as 'negative cases' in accordance with the rules and regulations in place at the time and no further action was taken".

In the run-up to the 2012 Summer Olympics, it was discovered that the American uniforms for the Games' opening and closing ceremonies, designed by Ralph Lauren, were manufactured in China. This sparked criticism of the USOPC from media pundits, the public and members of Congress.

In 2018, the USOPC came under fire for its complicity in the sexual assault and abuse of women and girls at the hands of former USA Gymnastics national team doctor Larry Nassar. Olympian Aly Raisman released a public statement accusing the committee of failing "to acknowledge its role in this mess." In the wake of Nasar's convictions, more than 150 lawsuits are pending against people and institutions related to the case, including the USOPC. In May 2018, the USOPC was accused of knowingly participating in sex trafficking in a class-action lawsuit. In response, the committee said it was "aggressively exploring and implementing new ways to enhance athlete safety".

Training facilities

The USOPC operates Olympic Training Centers at which aspiring Olympians prepare for international competition:
The main facility in Colorado Springs, Colorado, offers both summer and winter sports training in a variety of sports.  It houses the USOPC headquarters and many permanent athletic venues.
The ARCO Training Center in Chula Vista, California, offers training in various summer sports.  The largest facility there is a lake for canoeing and rowing.
The U.S. Olympic Center in Lake Placid, New York, is a facility for winter sports athletes.  Permanent facilities include an ice hockey/figure skating arena, a bobsled run, and a luge run.

Although catered toward elite athlete training, these complexes are also open to the public (the only Olympic training facilities in the world to be open to the public) and offer a variety of services, including tours and regular camps and competitions for various domestic and international sport programs.

Additionally, the USOPC partners with 16 elite training sites across the country, to provide U.S. athletes with Olympic-caliber facilities that positively impact performance. Facilities with U.S. Olympic training site designation have invested millions of dollars in operating, staffing, equipment and training costs. These sites are often selected to host U.S. Olympic Team Trials and support Team USA athletes prepare for the Olympic Games.

Awards
The USOPC administers a number of awards and honors for individuals and teams who have significant achievements in Olympic and Paralympic sports, or who have made contributions to the Olympic and Paralympic movement in the U.S.

USOPC Athlete of the Year – Awards are given annually to the top overall male athlete, female athlete, Paralympic athlete, and team, from among the USOPC's member organizations.
USOPC Coach of the Year – Awards are given annually to the top national, developmental, Paralympic, and volunteer coaches, and for achievement in sports science.
U.S. Olympic Hall of Fame – The Hall of Fame honors Olympic and Paralympic athletes, teams, coaches, and others who have demonstrated extraordinary service to the U.S. Olympic movement.
U.S. Olympic Spirit Award – This award is given biennially to athletes demonstrating spirit, courage, and achievement at the Olympic and Paralympic Games.
Jack Kelly Fair Play Award – Presented annually to an athlete, coach or official in recognition of an outstanding act of fair play and sportsmanship displayed during the past year. 
Rings of Gold Award – Awards are presented annually in honor of an individual and a program dedicated to helping children develop their Olympic or Paralympic dreams and reach their highest athletic and personal potential. 
Olympic Torch Award – Presented annually to an individual who has positively impacted the Olympic Movement and has contributed to promoting the Olympic Ideals throughout the U.S.

When a US athlete wins an Olympic medal, as of 2016 the USOPC pays the winner $25,000 for gold, $15,000 for silver and $10,000 for bronze. The USOPC increased the payouts by 25% to $37,000 for gold, $22,500 for silver and $15,000 for bronze beginning in 2017.

Partnerships
The USOPC generates support from two principal types of Olympic sponsorship: worldwide and domestic. Each level of sponsorship grants companies different marketing rights and offers exclusive use of designated Olympic and Team USA images and marks. Under the domestic sponsorship program, the USOPC also has special partnerships with various licensees, suppliers and outfitters that provide vital services and products to support Team USA. Across all levels of sponsorship, the USOPC is committed to preserving the values of the Olympic properties and protecting the exclusive rights of Olympic sponsors.

Worldwide
Created by the International Olympic Committee in 1985, the Olympic Partners TOP program is the highest level of Olympic sponsorship, granting exclusive worldwide marketing rights to the Olympic Games and Winter Olympic Games. Managed by the IOC, the TOP program supports the OCOGs, NOCs and the IOC.

Operating on a four-year term in line with each Olympic quadrennium, the TOP program features approximately 10 worldwide Olympic Partners, with each receiving exclusive global marketing rights within a designated product or service category.

US Domestic
The Olympic Games domestic sponsorship program grants marketing rights within the host country or territory only. Under the direction of the IOC, the USOPC manages the domestic program within the United States. Like the worldwide TOP program, the domestic sponsorship program operates on the principle of product-category exclusivity. Approximately 20 corporations currently participate in the U.S. domestic sponsorship program, which enables the USOPC to deliver increased funding and equitable distribution to National Governing Bodies. The establishment of these long-term domestic partnerships helps generate independent financial stability for American athletes while ensuring the viability of the Team USA on the international stage.

Licensees
The USOPC has granted licensing rights to nearly three dozen companies to manufacture and distribute official licensed products, which convey the rich history of American culture and commemorates the Olympic Movement. These companies are referred to as licensees and pay a royalty for each item sold bearing any related Olympic, USOPC or Team USA marks.

Media coverage
NBCUniversal has held the American broadcasting rights of the Summer Olympics since 1988, and the broadcasting rights of the Winter Olympics since 2002. In 2011, NBC agreed to a $4.38 billion contract with the International Olympic Committee to broadcast the 2014, 2016, 2018, and 2020 Games. On May 7, 2014, NBC agreed to a $7.75 billion contract with the IOC to broadcast the 2022, 2024, 2026, 2028, 2030, and 2032 Games. As such, NBC Olympics is the IOC's, and by extension the Olympic movement's, highest revenue stream. The IOC distributes Olympic broadcast revenue through Olympic Solidarity – the body responsible for managing and administering the share of the television rights of the Olympic Games. Under the current format, the revenue is allocated to the NOCs – including the USOPC – the local organizing committee and International Federations.

In 2009, the USOPC and Comcast announced plans for The U.S. Olympic Network, which would have aired Olympic-sports events, news, and classic footage. However, the USOPC met opposition from the International Olympic Committee, which preferred to deal with NBCU (and its then-new Universal Sports joint venture). Later, Comcast purchased NBCUniversal, and eventually Universal Sports was discontinued, with interim programming agreements to air events on NBCSN and Universal HD made. On July 1, 2017, NBCUniversal launched the Olympic Channel on the former channel space of Universal HD; the USOPC is a partial operating partner in the network with the NBC Sports Group and it contains archived content from the USOPC.

Relationship between IOC and USOPC
In May 2012, USOPC's leaders negotiated a resolution with the IOC, addressing a decades-long revenue sharing debate and paving the way for a peaceful future between the two bodies. The new agreement elevates the USOPC's global perception and restructures how worldwide Olympic sponsorship and U.S. TV revenues are shared, while providing for USOPC contributions to Olympic Games costs.

The agreement, revising 27-year-old terms governing the USOPC's shares of worldwide Olympic sponsorship and U.S. broadcast rights revenue, preserves the USOPC's future revenue at current levels and includes an escalator for inflation. Under the terms of the new agreement, the USOPC is guaranteed seven percent of the U.S. broadcast revenue and 10 percent of the IOC's global sponsorship revenue. The agreement guarantees the USOPC approximately $410 million per quadrennium, plus inflation and a percentage of revenue from new growth areas, beginning in 2020.

See also
United States Olympic & Paralympic Museum
United States Center for SafeSport
United States at the Olympics
United States at the Paralympics
United States at the Pan American Games
United States national team

References

External links
Official United States Olympic Team website
Official United States Paralympic Team website
Paralympic Sport Clubs - US Paralympics

United States at the Olympics
United States at the Paralympics
Disability organizations based in the United States
United States Olympic Committee
Olympic
1894 establishments in the United States
Organizations based in Colorado Springs, Colorado
Sports in Colorado Springs, Colorado
Sports organizations established in 1894
Patriotic and national organizations chartered by the United States Congress
 
Sports organizations of the United States